Michael Farrell may refer to:

Mike Farrell (born 1939), American actor
Mike Farrell (athlete) (born 1933), British middle-distance runner
Michael James Farrell (1926–1975), British economist
Michael Farrell (activist) (born 1944), Northern Irish civil rights activist
Michael Farrell (cricketer) (born 1968), Australian cricketer
Michael Farrell (footballer) (1902–?), Irish footballer
Michael W. Farrell (born 1938), Senior Judge of the District of Columbia Court of Appeals
Mike Farrell (ice hockey) (born 1978), retired American ice hockey defenseman
Michael Farrell (musician), keyboardist and songwriter
Michael Farrell (poet) (born 1965), Australian poet
Michael Farrell (powerlifter) (born 1962), Australian Paralympian 
Mike Farrell (speedway rider) (born 1955), Australian speedway rider
Michael Farrell (Irish writer) (1899–1962), Irish writer and broadcaster

See also:
Micheal Farrell (1940–2000), Irish artist